

Australian Floorball Association is the governing body for the sport of Floorball in Australia.  It is recognised by the Australian Sports Commission as the national sporting organisation (NSO) for floorball in Australia.

History

Structure
The national body has eight state member associations:

See also
IFF World Ranking
Asia Oceania Floorball Confederation
List of Asia Pacific Floorball champions

References

External links
 

Sports governing bodies in Australia
Floorball in Australia
1996 establishments in Australia
Sports organizations established in 1996
Floorball governing bodies
National members of the International Floorball Federation